Whiting Township is a township in Jackson County, Kansas, USA.  As of the 2000 census, its population was 362.

History
Whiting Township was formed in 1872.

Geography
Whiting Township covers an area of 36 square miles (93.23 square kilometers); of this, 0.04 square miles (0.11 square kilometers) or 0.12 percent is water. The stream of Muddy Creek runs through this township.

Cities and towns
 Whiting

Adjacent townships
 Horton Township, Brown County (northeast)
 Mission Township, Brown County (northeast)
 Grasshopper Township, Atchison County (east)
 Straight Creek Township (south)
 Liberty Township (southwest)
 Netawaka Township (west)
 Powhattan Township, Brown County (northwest)

Cemeteries
The township contains one cemetery, Spring Hill.

Major highways
 K-9

References
 U.S. Board on Geographic Names (GNIS)
 United States Census Bureau cartographic boundary files

External links
 US-Counties.com
 City-Data.com

Townships in Jackson County, Kansas
Townships in Kansas